Preventive analgesia is a practice aimed at reducing short- and long-term post-surgery pain. Activity in the body's pain signalling system during surgery produces "sensitization"; that is, it  increases the intensity of post-operative pain. Reducing activity in the body's pain-signalling system by the use of analgesics before, during and immediately after surgery is thought to reduce subsequent sensitization, and consequently the intensity of post-surgery pain. The types of nerve activity targeted in preventive analgesia include pre-surgery pain, all pain-system activity caused during surgery, and pain produced post-surgery by damage and inflammation.
A person's assessment of pain intensity from standard experimental stimuli prior to surgery is correlated with the intensity of their post-surgery pain. Pain intensity immediately post-surgery
is correlated with pain intensity on release from hospital, and correlated with the likelihood of experiencing chronic post-surgery pain.
Different medications such as pregabalin, acetaminophen, naproxen and dextromethorphan have been tried in studies about preemptive analgesia. It is not known what causes some cases of acute post-surgery pain to become chronic long-term problems but pain intensity in the short- and long-term post-operative period is correlated with the amount of pain system activity during and around the time of the surgery. It is not known whether reducing post-operative sensitization by the use of preventive analgesia will affect the likelihood of acute post-operative pain becoming chronic.

References

Pain
Anesthesia